William Philip Hiern  (19 January 1839, in Stafford – 28 November 1925, in Barnstaple) was a British mathematician and botanist.

Life
Hiern attended St. John's College, Cambridge, from 1857 to 1861 and attained a "first class degree" in mathematics.  Later, in 1886, he attended Oxford University.

Upon his marriage he moved to Surrey and developed an interest in botany.

In 1881, Hiern moved to Barnstaple in north Devonshire, and lived at the manor house adjacent to the Barnstaple Castle mound. Hiern was quite taken with the country squire role and he assumed many public duties including those of the Lord of the Manor of Stoke Rivers, northeast of Barnstaple, and he was one of the original aldermen of the County of Devon.

For a one-year term from 1916 to 1917, he was the president of the Devonshire Association.

Contributions
Hiern published over 50 works on botanical subjects. Among his chief works was the catalogue of the plants Friedrich Welwitsch had collected in Angola.

His botanical specimens are stored at Exeter's Royal Albert Memorial Museum, at Kew Gardens, and at Cambridge.

Awards and honours
In 1903, Hiern was elected a fellow of the Royal Society.

The African figwort genus Hiernia  was named in his honor, as was the Ixora hiernii (a tropical evergreen shrub), the Pavetta hierniana (an evergreen shrub) and the Coffea canephora var hiernii (a species of coffee plant). Gabon Ebony (Diospyros crassiflora, itself the source of much taxonomic confusion over the years) was also first described by Hiern in 1873.

Notes

External links 

 
 
 
 

19th-century British mathematicians
20th-century British mathematicians
1839 births
1925 deaths
Alumni of St John's College, Cambridge
British botanists
Fellows of the Royal Society
Fellows of the Linnean Society of London